David Anthony Kenny (born November 10, 1946) is an American social psychologist and Distinguished Professor Emeritus in the Department of Psychological Sciences at the University of Connecticut in Storrs, Connecticut. He is a member of the American Academy of Arts and Sciences. Among the subjects he has researched are the interpersonal perception, the statistical analysis of data from dyads and groups, as well as mediation analysis. He co-authored a 1986 paper with Reuben M. Baron on mediation analysis that has been highly influential in the years since, with 114,891 citations (Google Scholar, September 2022). He received the American Psychological Association's Award for Distinguished Scientific Contributions to Psychology in 2019.

References

External links
Faculty page
Profile at Social Psychology Network
Personal website

1946 births
Living people
Fellows of the American Academy of Arts and Sciences
American social psychologists
University of Connecticut faculty
University of California, Davis alumni
Northwestern University alumni